Contentment, also known as the Colonel George Imboden House, is a historic home located at Ansted, Fayette County, West Virginia. It was built about 1830 and expanded to its present configuration after its acquisition by former Confederate Colonel George W. Imboden in 1872.  The original home consisted of five rooms and a detached kitchen.  Colonel Imboden added two rooms, extended the porch, and added a gable end chimney.  Colonel Imboden, who was Ansted's first mayor, helped stimulate the growth of the town's businesses. The Contentment Historical Complex serves as the museum and headquarters for the Fayette County Historical Society.

It was listed on the National Register of Historic Places in 1974.

References

External links
Contentment Historical Complex website

Historic house museums in West Virginia
Houses on the National Register of Historic Places in West Virginia
Houses completed in 1872
Houses completed in 1830
Houses in Fayette County, West Virginia
Museums in Fayette County, West Virginia
Open-air museums in West Virginia
National Register of Historic Places in Fayette County, West Virginia
1830 establishments in Virginia